The Chocolate Hills are a geological formation in the Bohol province of the Philippines. They are covered in green grass that turns brown during the dry season, hence the name.

The Chocolate Hills are a famous tourist attraction of Bohol. They are featured in the provincial flag and seal to symbolize the abundance of natural attractions in the province. They are in the Philippine Tourism Authority's list of tourist destinations in the Philippines; they have been declared the country's third National Geological Monument and proposed for inclusion in the UNESCO World Heritage List.

Description

The Chocolate Hills form a rolling terrain of haycock-shaped hills—mounds of a generally conical and almost symmetrical shape. Estimated to be from 1,268 to about 1,776 individual mounds, these cone-shaped or dome-shaped hills are actually made of grass-covered limestone. One of Bohol's best known tourist attractions, these unique mound-shaped hills are scattered by the hundreds throughout the towns of Carmen, Batuan and Sagbayan.

Vegetation

During the dry season, the grass-covered hills dry up and turn chocolate brown. The vegetation is dominated by grass species such as Imperata cylindrica and Saccharum spontaneum. Several Compositae and ferns also grow on them. In  between the hills, the flat lands are cultivated with rice and other cash crops. However, the natural vegetation on the Chocolate Hills is now threatened by quarrying activities.

Origin

The Chocolate Hills are conical karst hills. These hills consist of Late Pliocene to Early Pleistocene, thin to medium bedded, sandy to rubbly marine limestone. These limestones contain the abundant fossils of shallow marine foraminifera, coral, mollusks, and algae. These conical hills are geomorphological features called cockpit karst, which were created by a combination of the dissolution of limestone by rainfall, surface water, and groundwater, and their subaerial erosion by streams after they had been uplifted above sea level and fractured by tectonic processes. These hills are separated by well developed flat plains and contain numerous caves and springs. The Chocolate Hills are considered to be a remarkable example of conical karst topography.

The origin for the conical karst of the Chocolate Hills is described in popular terms on the bronze plaque at the viewing deck in Carmen, Bohol. This plaque states that they are eroded formations of a type of marine limestone that sits on top of hardened clay. The plaque reads:The unique land form known as the Chocolate Hills of Bohol was formed ages ago by the uplift of coral deposits and the action of rain water and erosion.The plaque also makes reference to a fanciful explanation of the origin of the Chocolate Hills that is unsupported by any published scientific research, e.g. neither Hillmer nor Travaglia and others, when it states: 
Self-published, popular web pages present a variety of fanciful and less credible explanations about how these hills formed. They include sub-oceanic volcanism; limestone covered blocks created by the destruction of an active volcano in a cataclysmic eruption; and tidal movements. The lack of any exposed or associated volcanic rocks in the Chocolate Hills refutes the popular theories involving volcanic eruptions. The theories involving either a sudden, massive geologic shift, coral reefs being erupted from the sea, or tidal movements lack any corroborating evidence and support among geologists.

Legend
The Chocolate Hills inspired many legends. One tells a story of two giants fighting by throwing stones and sand on each other. After the fight, the hills remained. Another legend speaks about a young, strong giant who fell in love with a human girl. When she died, he cried and his tears then petrified and formed the Chocolate Hills.

Tourism

Two of the hills have been developed into tourist resorts.

Protection

Legislation
The National Committee on Geological Sciences declared the Chocolate Hills of Bohol a National Geological Monument on June 18, 1988, in recognition of its special characteristics, scientific importance, uniqueness, and high scenic value. As such, this included the Chocolate Hills among the country's protected areas. More protection was provided by Proclamation No. 1037 signed by President Fidel V. Ramos on July 1, 1997, which established the Chocolate Hills and the areas within, around, and surrounding them located in the municipalities of Carmen, Batuan and Sagbayan, Bilar, Valencia and Sierra Bullones, Province of Bohol as a natural monument to protect and maintain its natural beauty and to provide restraining mechanisms for inappropriate exploitation. As such, they are covered under the National Integrated Protected Areas System with the Department of Environment and Natural Resources (DENR) as the lead implementing agency for its protection.

Land-use conflict prompted President Gloria Macapagal-Arroyo to sign an amendment to Proclamation 468 dated September 26, 1994, declaring the land around or in between Chocolate Hills as no longer part of the national monument during the Bohol Sandugo Celebration on July 17, 2002. This amendment allowed the tracts of land surrounding and within the famous tourist spot to be developed by the provincial government and other entities that have control over the area. Further, the amended proclamation ensures that the areas that have to be preserved are preserved, while those that could be developed would be excluded from the national monument area and classified as alienable and disposable by the government. The president initially decided on the issue during the joint meeting of the Regional Development Council-Regional Peace and Order Council of Region VII which was conducted at the Bohol Tropics Resort.

Bills have been filed aiming to strengthen protection of the hills. On July 6, 2004, the Philippine House of Representatives introduced House Bill No. 01147 entitled "an act declaring the Chocolate Hills as national patrimony and geological monuments, penalizing their plunder, destruction or defacement, and for other purposes." The house bill was authored by Congressman Eladio "Boy" Jala and co-authored by Congressman Roilo Z. Golez and Edgar M. Chatto. Though this has not been passed into law.

On May 16, 2006, the DENR submitted the Chocolate Hills to the UNESCO World Heritage for inclusion in the list of Natural Monuments because of its outstanding universal value:

Issues
Balancing their protection, resource utilization and tourism are the challenges faced by the Chocolate Hills. Before they were designated national geological monuments, some of the hills (about ) were classified as alienable and disposable or private lands such that they were titled to some locals. The declaration consequently caused some social unrest, resulting in almost simultaneous civil uprising, led by the long-established New People's Army (generally described as Maoist guerrillas) establishing a new front, known as the Chocolate Hills Command. To some farmers, the proclamation is a government scheme which suppresses their right to own lands. As such, conflicts between the New People's Army group and government military forces escalated, culminating in two major engagements.

Being alienable and disposable lands, the Chocolate Hills are seen as quarrying assets and source of income for small-scale miners, as well as quarry materials for the province's construction projects. The challenge is how the national and local officials can harmonize the current needs of small-scale miners, the construction sector and the tourism sector with the preservation of the Chocolate Hills. Even with their protected status, mining permits continue to be granted by DENR and local government units.  Hence, mining and quarrying are still taking place. Because of this, the provincial government of Bohol has requested jurisdiction over the Chocolate Hills from the DENR. Meanwhile, the provincial government has suggested that the legislation defining the Natural Monument should be changed, which will require that the proclamation be redrafted and ratified by both the Philippine House and Senate. This is a cumbersome and costly process, on which no progress has been made to date. Future development and investment challenges within the Chocolate Hills area include: obtaining the national government's sanction for the project; persuading landowners to sell; convincing the Protected Areas Management Board, which has jurisdiction over the hills, not to use its veto power over any investment requiring physical facilities.

2013 Bohol earthquake 

One of the largest earthquakes to hit Bohol struck the island at 8:12 AM on October 15, 2013. The center of the M7.2 earthquake was near Sagbayan, Bohol. Due to the earthquake, a portion of one of the hills gave way and the Chocolate Hills' viewing deck was destroyed.

Restoration 
The local government proposed a 200 million pesos funding for the repair work, and restored the viewing deck and the surrounding facilitaties, including the pathways, parking space, water features, trellis, stairs, ramps, food court, museum, activity center, lamp posts, signages and landscaping works.

See also 
List of protected areas of the Philippines
Breast-shaped hill
 Kegelkarst

References

External links

UNESCO World Heritage: Chocolate Hills Natural Monument

Articles 
Chocolate Hills Chocolate hills travel information
The Chocolate Hills
"Guv issues orders to protect Choco Hills, aid brgy workers", Bohol Sunday Post, 06/11/06
House Bill 001147

Landforms of Bohol
Hills of the Philippines
National geological monuments of the Philippines
Visayan landmarks
Natural monuments of the Philippines
Tourist attractions in Bohol
World Heritage Tentative List for the Philippines